Ibrahim Osman (born 2004) is a Ghanaian professional footballer who plays as a forward for Danish side Nordsjælland.

Club career
Osman joined Danish side Nordsjælland in early 2023 from the Right to Dream Academy in Ghana. He made his debut in February 2023, coming on as a substitute for compatriot Ernest Nuamah in a 4–2 win over Odense Boldklub.

Career statistics

Club

References

2004 births
Living people
Ghanaian footballers
Association football forwards
Right to Dream Academy players
Danish Superliga players
FC Nordsjælland players
Ghanaian expatriate footballers
Ghanaian expatriate sportspeople in Denmark
Expatriate footballers in Denmark